Daban is a village and rural commune in the Cercle of Kati in the Koulikoro Region of south-western Mali. The commune is the most northerly of the cercle. It contains 11 villages in an area of 737 square kilometers and at the time of 2009 census had a population of 9,435. The village of Daban is 80 km northwest of Kati, the chef-lieu of the cercle.

References

External links
.

Communes of Koulikoro Region